Ephestiodes erythrella is a moth of the family Pyralidae described by Émile Louis Ragonot in 1887. It is native to North America, where it is found from Texas and Ontario westward, including British Columbia, California and Utah. It is an introduced species in Hawaii.

The wingspan is about 13–16 mm.

External links
Images at the Moth Photographers Group of Mississippi State University

Moths described in 1887
Phycitinae
Taxa named by Émile Louis Ragonot